Leonard S. Baker (January 24, 1931 – November 23, 1984) was an American writer.

He won the 1979 Pulitzer Prize for Biography or Autobiography for Days of Sorrow and Pain: Leo Baeck and the Berlin Jews (Oxford University Press), a book about Leo Baeck.

His other published works include The Johnson Eclipse: A President's Vice Presidency, Back to Back: The Duel Between FDR and the Supreme Court, John Marshall: A Life in Law, Brandeis and Frankfurter: A Dual Biography, Brahmin in Revolt, Roosevelt and Pearl Harbor, and The Guaranteed Society.

A 1952 graduate of the University of Pittsburgh's School of Arts and Sciences, Baker was a reporter for the St. Louis Globe-Democrat from 1955 to 1956 and for Newsday from 1956 to 1965. He was married to Liva Baker (1930-2007), author of The Justice From Beacon Hill: The Life and Times of Oliver Wendell Holmes and other books, and had two children, David Baker and Sara Baker.

References
 

1984 deaths
20th-century American biographers
American male biographers
20th-century American historians
American male non-fiction writers
Pulitzer Prize for Biography or Autobiography winners
University of Pittsburgh alumni
St. Louis Globe-Democrat people
1931 births
20th-century American male writers